Arenibacter latericius is a Gram-negative, aerobic, rod-shaped and non-motile bacterium from the genus Arenibacter which has been isolated from sandy sediments from the South China Sea.

References

External links
Type strain of Arenibacter latericius at BacDive -  the Bacterial Diversity Metadatabase	

Flavobacteria
Bacteria described in 2001